The Buddhist Broadcasting Foundation is a religious broadcasting organization based in the Netherlands.

It produces and broadcasts a variety of programs on topics of Buddhism and Zen Buddhism.

See also
 Boeddhistische Omroep Stichting
 Global Buddhist Network
 The Buddhist (TV channel)
 Shraddha TV
 Lord Buddha TV
 Access to Insight

References

External links
 Buddhist Broadcasting Foundation Website

Buddhist television
Buddhism in the Netherlands
Religious broadcasting
Religious organisations based in the Netherlands